The altostratus undulatus is a type of altostratus cloud with signature undulations within it. These undulations may be visible (usually as "wavy bases"), but frequently they are indiscernible to the naked eye. These formations will generally appear in the early stages of destabilizing return flows, especially over the southern plains of the United States, when the surface temperature is still relatively cool. The wavy strips of clouds are generally near an inversion surface.

Also referred to as billow clouds, wind row clouds, or wave clouds, variations of the undulatus can be elements that have merged or single elements that have stretched through the sky.

See also
 Weather
 Atmosphere
 Cloud types
 Undular bore

References

External links
 American Meteorological Society's Glossary of Meteorology
 Stormeyes, a website for storm watchers (and storm chasers)
 Weather Photography

Stratus